Oscar Otte was the defending champion but chose not to defend his title.

Tommy Robredo won the title after defeating Christian Garín 3–6, 6–3, 6–2 in the final.

Seeds

Draw

Finals

Top half

Bottom half

References
Main Draw
Qualifying Draw

Lisboa Belém Open - Singles
2018 Singles
2018 Lisboa Belém Open